Liu Zhenyun (born May 1958) is a Chinese novelist and screenwriter. He is best known for his novel Someone to Talk To (awarded the 2011 Mao Dun Literature Prize) as well as his involvement with the many film adaptions of his books. Among these is I Am Not Madame Bovary, produced in collaboration with director Feng Xiaogang, a frequent collaborator of Liu. He is married to noted human rights activist Guo Jianmei.

Life and Work
Liu grew up in the village of Laozhuang in Yanjin County, Henan, China. At age 14, he left his village and joined the army. At age 20, he took the national college entrance exam, achieved the highest score in Henan province, and was accepted at Peking University. After graduation, he became a journalist. In the 1980s Liu began to concentrate seriously on his literary career, publishing his debut novella Tapu, in 1987.

He went on to publish novels such as Hometown, Regime and Blood (故乡天下黄花), Anecdotes in the Hometown (故乡相处流传), Material and Spirit in the Hometown (故乡面和花朵), Nonsense Talk (一腔废话), Cell Phone (手机), The Cook, the Crook, and the Real Estate Tycoon (我叫刘跃进).

His novels Someone to Talk To (一句顶一万句) and I Did Not Kill My Husband (我不是潘金莲) have sold over a million copies each. Someone to Talk To was awarded with Mao Dun Literature Prize in 2011 and has sold more than 1.6 million copies.

He has also authored novellas such as A Small Town: Tapu (塔铺), Recruits (新兵连), The Office (单位), Ground Covered with Chicken Feathers (一地鸡毛), Remembering 1942 (温故一九四二). Throughout the years, Liu's works have been translated into over 28 languages.

Many of Liu's books have been adapted into TV series and movies. He has written the screenplays for some of them including: A Small Town: Tapu, Ground Covered with Chicken Feathers, The Cook, the Crook, and the Real Estate Tycoon, Remembering 1942, Someone to Talk To, I Did Not Kill My Husband. Several of these adapted films have been awarded in the film festivals around the world, including the Toronto International Film Festival, the Rome Film Festival, the Busan International Film Festival, and the Hong Kong International Film Festival, among others.

Themes and influences
Liu often credits his upbringing in Yanjin county as influencing his work, especially growing up in the shadow of the 1942 famine. He also is noted for including political criticism as well as advocating for social justice in his works.

Works

Awards
 2011: Mao Dun Literature Prize, winner, One Sentence Is Ten Thousand Sentences

External links
 Interviews with Liu Zhenyun  
 List of works (in Chinese)

References

1958 births
Living people
Chinese male novelists
Mao Dun Literature Prize laureates
Peking University alumni
Writers from Xinxiang
People's Liberation Army personnel
People's Republic of China journalists